The Woman on the Panther is a 1923 German silent film directed by Alfred Halm and starring Grete Reinwald, Hermann Thimig, and Olga Limburg.

Cast
 Grete Reinwald
 Hermann Thimig
 Olga Limburg
 Ilka Grüning
 Wilhelm Diegelmann
 Karl Harbacher
 Charles Puffy
 Hans Junkermann
 Arnold Rieck

References

Bibliography
 Bock, Hans-Michael & Bergfelder, Tim. The Concise CineGraph. Encyclopedia of German Cinema. Berghahn Books, 2009.

External links

1923 films
Films of the Weimar Republic
German silent feature films
Films directed by Alfred Halm
German black-and-white films
1920s German films